Khanimeh-ye Bala (also Romanized as Khanīmeh-ye Bālā; also known as Khanīmeh-ye ’Olyā) is a village in Rostam-e Seh Rural District, Sorna District, Rostam County, Fars Province, Iran. At the 2006 census, its population was 209, in 31 families.

References 

Populated places in Rostam County